Felix Sandy (born 16 December 1964) is a Sierra Leonean sprinter. He competed in the men's 400 metres at the 1988 Summer Olympics.

References

1964 births
Living people
Athletes (track and field) at the 1984 Summer Olympics
Athletes (track and field) at the 1988 Summer Olympics
Sierra Leonean male sprinters
Olympic athletes of Sierra Leone
Athletes (track and field) at the 1990 Commonwealth Games
Commonwealth Games competitors for Sierra Leone
Place of birth missing (living people)